During the 1997–98 English football season, Bristol City F.C. competed in the Football League Second Division.

Season summary
In the 1997–98 season, Bristol City achieved promotion to Division One, which was confirmed on 10 April 1998 after Grimsby failed to win at Wycombe and can only manage a 1–1 draw. It was also thoroughly deserved as they were in the top two since the beginning of November and also going on a brilliant run of form midway through the season which saw them lose only one from 21 league games and winning eight consecutive games during that run.

Final league table

Results
Bristol City's score comes first

Legend

Football League Second Division

FA Cup

League Cup

Football League Trophy

Squad

References

Bristol City F.C. seasons
Bristol City